Xenarchus admirabilis is a moth of the family Aididae. It was described by William Schaus in 1894 and is found in Brazil.

References

Moths described in 1894
Zygaenoidea